The List of members from the fourth term of the Assembly of Experts. consists of names of the members during the fourth term of the Assembly of Experts from 2006 to 2016. Elections for the Assembly of Experts occurs every 8 years. However, for the fourth term it was 10 years because the elections that took place for the fifth term was planned for 2014 but was postponed to 2016 in order to be held alongside the 2016 Iranian legislative election.  

"Assembly of experts (of the Leadership)", or the "Council of Experts" is the deliberative body empowered to appoint and dismiss the Supreme Leader of Iran; and Seyyed Ali Khamenei is the current supreme leader of Iran. Ali Khamenei was the Leader during this term. 

The elections took place on 15 December 2006, with the Inauguration occurring on 20 February 2007.

Members 
The list is ordered Alphabetically.

Members with * next to their name, indicates they died while in office.

 Ardabil

 Hassan Ameli
 Mir Ebrahim Seyyed Hatami

 Bushehr

 Hashem Hosseini Bushehri

 Chaharmahal and Bakhtiari

 

 East Azerbaijan

 Hashem Hashemzadeh Herisi (Replaced Morteza Bani Fazel)
 Mohammad Feyz Sarabi
 Mohammad Taghi Pourmohammadi
 Mohammad Vaez Mousavi
 Mohsen Mojtahed Shabestari
 Morteza Bani Fazel - * (27 May 2010) 

 Fars

 Ahmad Beheshti
 Ali Mohammad Dastgheib Shirazi
 Assad-Allah Imani
 
 Seyed Ali Asghar Dastgheib

 Gilan

 Abbas Mahfouzi
  * (10 June 2015)
 Reza Ramezani Gilani
 Zaynolabideen Ghorbani

 Golestan

 Habibollah Taheri Gorgani - * (29 December 2007) 
  (Replaced Habibollah Taheri Gorgani)
 Seyed Kazem Noor Mofidi

 Hamadan

 
 

 Hormozgan

 

 Ilam

 Seyed Mojtaba Taheri -

 Isfahan

 
 
 Morteza Moghtadai
 
 Yousef Tabatabai Nejad

 Kerman

 Ahmad Khatami
 Ali Movahedi-Kermani
  

 Kermanshah

 
  * (27 May 2014)

 Khuzestan

 Abbas Ka'bi
 Ali Fallahian
 Mohammad Ali Mousavi Jazayeri
 
 Mohsen Heidari Alekasir
 Seyyed Ali Shafiei

 Kohgiluyeh and Boyer-Ahmad

 Seyed Karamatollah Malek-Hosseini * (2 November 2012)
  (Replaced Seyed Karamatollah Malek-Hosseini)

 Kurdistan

 
  (Replaced Mohammad Seikh Al-Eslami)
  * (17 September 2009)

 Lorestan

  * (7 September 2014)
 

 Markazi

 Ahmad Mohseni Garakani
  

 Mazandaran

 
  
  * (31 August 2014)
 Sadeq Larijani

 North Khorasan

 

 Qazvin

 
 

 Qom

 Mohammad Momen

 Razavi Khorasan

 Abbas Vaez-Tabasi * (4 March 2016)
 Abolghasem Khazali * (16 September 2015)
 Ahmad Alamolhoda
 
  (Replaced Mohammad Reza Faker)
 Mahmoud Hashemi Shahroudi
  * (10 February 2010)

 Semnan

 Seyed Mohammad Shahcheraghi

 Sistan and Baluchestan

 Abbas-Ali Soleimani
 

 South Khorasan

 Ebrahim Raisi

 Tehran

 Abdul-Nabi Namazi
 Ahmad Jannati
 Akbar Hashemi Rafsanjani
 Ali Meshkini * (30 July 2007)
 Ghorbanali Dorri-Najafabadi
 Hassan Rouhani
 Mahmoud Alavi (Replaced Seyed Mohammad Hassan Marashi)
 Mohammad Bagher Bagheri Kani
 Mohammed Emami-Kashani
 Mohammad Mohammadi Gilani * (9 July 2014)
 Mohammad-Reza Mahdavi Kani (Replaced Ali Meshkini) * (21 October 2014)
 Mohammad-Taqi Mesbah-Yazdi
 Mohammad Yazdi
 
 Mohsen Kharazi
 Mohsen Qomi
 Reza Ostadi
  * (18 August 2008)

 West Azerbaijan

 Asghar Dirbaz (Replaced Mir Akbar Ghaffar Gharabakh)
 Ali Akbar Ghoreishi
 Hassan Namazi
  * (27 March 2012)

 Yazd

 Abolghasem Wafi Yazdi

 Zanjan

 Mohammad Taghi Vaezi

See also 

 2006 Iranian Assembly of Experts election
 Results of the 2006 Iranian Assembly of Experts election
 Assembly of Experts
 List of members in the First Term of the Council of Experts
 List of members in the Second Term of the Council of Experts
 List of members in the Third Term of the Council of Experts
List of members in the Fifth Term of the Council of Experts
 List of chairmen of the Assembly of Experts

References 

Assembly of Experts
Lists of office-holders
Electoral colleges
Politics of Iran
Government of the Islamic Republic of Iran
Assemblies in Iran